Heteroradulum is a genus of fungi in the order Auriculariales. Species produce effused, leathery basidiocarps (fruit bodies) on wood, often pinkish red and partly or wholly covered in small sterile spines. The genus was originally published in 1917 by American mycologist Curtis Gates Lloyd under the facetious pseudonym "McGinty", rendering the name invalid. It was validated a century later to accommodate a group of species formerly placed in the genera Eichleriella or Heterochaete, but not closely related to either.

References

External links

Auriculariales
Agaricomycetes genera